Versal may refer to:

 Versal, a literary magazine
 Versal, choice of case in text.
 Ornamental initials which are embellished, or even historiated initials such as found in an illuminated manuscript.